Club Deportivo Real Zamora was a Mexican football club that played in the Liga Premier - Serie A, however, from 2019 to 2020 season, the club is on hiatus because the club is in a process to improve its facilities and aspire to a promotion to the Liga de Expansión MX. The club was formed in 1950 and has played in the first division among other leagues in Mexico. In April 2016, Real Zamora defeated Sporting Canamy 2–0 to clinch a spot for the Ascenso to the Liga Premier de Ascenso against UAT B, after that Zamora defeated UAT B and earned the promotion to the LP.

History

C.D. Zamora
The club was founded on December 26, 1950, and quickly joined Mexican Second Division along with Zacatepec, Monterrey, Toluca, Deportivo Irapuato, Zamora, Querétaro, Morelia and Pachuca. Some clubs were newcomers, and some were rejoining the league. In their first league, the club quickly became a contender and finished a couple of points behind the champion Zacatepec, who earned the chance to join the Primera División de México. The following years were also successful years, but not good enough to crown themselves.

In the 1954-55 tournament, the club once again finished runner-up, this time just behind F.C. Atlas;, this time the club was allowed to be promoted after the federation decided to increase the number of clubs in the top division to 14. A playoff tournament was organized with 2 clubs from the first division along with the 11 and 12 place clubs from the first division clubs: Cuautla FC, Zamora, Querétaro, Atlante and Marte. With the result of Atlante remaining in the top division, joined by Cuautla FC and Zamora. Querétaro remained in the second division, joined by the relegated Marte.

In the 1955-56 season the club played its first tournament in the top league under the management of the Enrique Álvarez.The club had a terrible time in the top division and so lost the category, being relegated back to the second division, leaving its spot to C.F. Monterrey, who had been promoted.

In the 1956–57 season, the club finally won its first title led by the Argentine Raúl Leguizamón. This time the club took over the empty spot left by C.F. Monterrey, who a year ago had taken over the spot Zamora had left. That same year Puebla FC decided to leave the league, and so its spot was taken over by Atlético Morelia, marking this the first time 2 clubs from the state of Michoacán played in the top division.

The club once again lost the category in the 1959-60 tournament after playing 3 not-so-good tournaments, with its best season finish in 1957–58,  finishing 7th with 25 points. In 1960 the club finished last under the management of Carlos Seville.

The club would not return to the first division, having 2 good opportunities one in 1963-64 when they played a promotion matched against Cruz Azul who would beat them 7–1. The club would eventually be relegated to the third division where they would win the 1977-78 title to return to the second division where in 1982-83 tournament they would have its second opportunity to return to the top division facing Unión de Curtidores in a second promotional match which they lost 1–0.

Resurgence 
A second division team returned to Zamora in 1989–90, when Cachorros Guaymas moved to the city. In this season, the club won the Segunda División "B" and was promoted to Segunda "A". In 1990-91 was relegated to Segunda "B", in 1994 was dissolved.

The club has played on and off since 1994 until 2004, when was created a new team called Jaguares de Zamora, a Chiapas inferior reserve squad. In 2007 the club became once again independent and rejoined the Segunda División Profesional until 2008.

In 2010, the club returned with the name Atlético Zamora in Second Division, playing in Liga de Nuevos Talentos, this team was dissolved in 2011, its franchise was moved to Cuernavaca to compete in the Liga Premier de Ascenso.

Real Zamora
In 2008 a club called Real Zamora was created in the Third Division. Real Zamora was created from the license of Real Cavadas, who played at La Piedad, in 2008–09 season, the team played with Real Cavadas register. As of the 2009–10 season, the team got its name officially.

In 2013–14 season, Real Zamora reached the final of the championship, the team was defeated by Tuzos Pachuca. The status as runner-up allowed the team to be promoted to the Liga de Nuevos Talentos.

In the Apertura 2015 tournament, Real Zamora was runner-up of Liga de Nuevos Talentos, the squad was defeated by Universidad Autónoma de Tamaulipas. However, in Clausura 2016, Real Zamora won the tournament by defeating Sporting Canamy by a 4-1 aggregate score. The squad won the right to play the promotion playoff against Universidad Autónoma de Tamaulipas, Real Zamora won the series by a 7-1 aggregate score and was promoted to Liga Premier de Ascenso.

In 2016-17 season Real Zamora was promoted to the Liga Premier de Ascenso, with this achievement, the club and the city council collaborated to resume the construction works of the Estadio Zamora with the aim of fulfilling the guidelines of the Second Division.  On October 1, 2016, Real Zamora played its first game in the stadium. The team played its first three games in the Estadio Juan N. López, La Piedad. In June 2017, the former footballer Heriberto Morales acquired 30% of the club's shares through the Promotora Valladolid. However, he sold his participation a year later.

In July 2018, José Trinidad Melgoza, who was part of the board of the Reboceros de La Piedad, decided to move the project of the mentioned club to join him with the Zamora's team, including footballers and coaching staff, and he went on to be a majority partner in addition to taking the vice-presidency of the team. With the arrival of Melgoza to the administration, a Real Zamora's reserve squad was created, this team plays in Tercera División, however the reserve squad participate in this season with the Queseros de San José register.

In December 2018, Melgoza returned to La Piedad board, with this fact Real Zamora and Reboceros de La Piedad started an exchange of players and coaches between both teams with the aim of uniting their projects and promoting the development of football in the region.

On June 28, 2019, it was announced that the team's franchise was put on hiatus during a season due to the breach of the sports infrastructure required by the Liga Premier de México - Serie A, the period without activity was reserved to make the necessary improvements to comply with the regulation and thus qualify for promotion to a higher category.

In July 2020, due to the problem with its facilities, the Real Zamora franchise was used so that Azores de Hidalgo could compete in the Liga Premier de México. For the 2021–22 season, the Real Zamora franchise officially became Inter de Querétaro F.C., thus eliminating any option to return to Zamora.

Players

First-team squad

Honours
 Segunda División Profesional  (1): 1956-1957
Runner Up: 1950–1951, 1954–1955, 1970–1971, 1982–1983
 Serie B de México (1): Clausura 2016
Runner Up: Apertura 2015
Tercera División de México (1): 1977-1978
Runner Up: 2013–2014

References

See also
Football in Mexico

Football clubs in Michoacán
Association football clubs established in 1950
1950 establishments in Mexico
Liga Premier de México